David W. Potter (born 29 August 1948) is a Scottish sports writer who has published more than fifty books, primarily on Scottish football and cricket.

Career 
He taught Spanish and Classics at Glenrothes High School from 1971 – 2003 and then taught classics part-time at Osborne House School in Dysart.

He has commentated on football matches for Kirkcaldy's hospital radio service and has also written for the programmes of Celtic, Forfar Athletic and Raith Rovers football clubs. He umpires cricket matches in the summer and is the scorer for Falkland Cricket Club. His other passion is drama and he has also written a history of Kirkcaldy's Auld Kirk Players.

David Potter published his first book in 1996. Titled Our Bhoys Have Won the Cup!, it was published when Celtic had won the Scottish Cup for the thirtieth time. In 2004 he published a biography of footballer Bobby Murdoch. Of the sixty books in his bibliography, twenty-nine are about Celtic Football Club and/or its players.

Personal life 
He lives with his wife Rosemary in Kirkcaldy.

Bibliography
Our Bhoys Have Won the Cup!, John Donald, 1996, 
Jock Stein - The Celtic Years (with Tom Campbell), Mainstream, 1999, 
The Encyclopaedia of Scottish Cricket, Empire, 1999, 
The Mighty Atom - The Life and Times of Patsy Gallacher, Parrs Wood Press, 2000, 
Wee Troupie: The Alex Troup Story, Tempus, 2002, 
Celtic in the League Cup, The History Press, 2002, 
Willie Maley - The Man Who Made Celtic, Tempus, 2003, 
Walk On - Celtic Since McCann, Fort, 2003, 
Bobby Murdoch, Different Class (with Billy McNeil), Empire, 2004, 
Wizards and Bravehearts, A History of the Scottish National Side, Tempus, 2004, 
Ten Days That Shook Celtic (with nine others), Fort, 2005, 
Jimmy Delaney - The Stuff of Legend, Breedon, 2006, 
150 Not Out, Dunnikier Cricket Club 2006
Celtic’s Cult Heroes, Know the Score, 2008, 
The Encyclopaedia of Scottish Football (with Phil H Jones), Know the Score, 2008, 
Celtic’s Greatest Games, Know the Score, 2009, 
Tommy McInally - Celtic’s Bad Bhoy?, Black & White, 2009, 
Scotland’s Greatest Games, Know the Score, 2009,  
The Dear Old Paradise: The Changing Face of Celtic Park, Derby Books, 2010, 
Newcastle’s 50 Greatest Games, Derby Books, 2010, 
The Mighty Quinn - Jimmy Quinn, Celtic's First Goalscoring Hero, Tempus 
Rovers Greats, Raith Trust 2008
Forfar Greats, Forfar Athletic FC 2009
A Long Innings, Kirkcaldy Cricket Club 2010
Kirkcaldy's Parliamentarians, Kirkcaldy Civic Society 2010
The Encyclopaedia of Scottish Football - Expanded Edition (with Phil H Jones), Pitch Publishing 2011, 
The Celtic FC Miscellany, The History Press 2012, 
Celtic FC On This Day, Pitch Publishing 2012, 
Newcastle United On This Day, Pitch Publishing 2012, 
125 Years of Competitive Matches (with Marie Rowan), Celtic FC 2012,  
Sunny Jim Young, Celtic Legend, D B Publishing 2013, 
Jimmy McMenemy: Celtic's Napoleon, DB Publishing 2013, 
'Tis A Hundred Years Syne, Kirkcaldy in World War 1, Kirkcaldy Civic Society 2013.
Never Mind The Hoops (Quiz Book), The History Press 2014, 
The Encyclopaedia of Scottish Football - Concise Edition (with Phil H Jones), Pitch Publishing 2014, 
Keeping in Paradise (with John Fallon), Black & White Publishing 2015, 
Never Mind The Tartan Army (Quiz Book), The History Press 2015, 
Sandy McMahon & The Early Celts, DB Publishing 2015, 
Famous Kirkcaldy Men, Austin Macauley 2016, 
Celtic's Goalkeepers (with Marie Rowan), D B Publishing 2016, 
I Remember 67 Well: Celtic's European Cup Year, Pitch Publishing 2016, 
Charlie Gallagher? - What A Player (with Stephen Cameron, Illustrator), CQN Books 2016, 
The History of the Scottish Cup (with Phil H Jones), Pitch Publishing 2016, 
Forfar Athletic On This Day, Kennedy & Boyd 2017, 
Celtic The Invincibles 2016-17, DB Publishing 2017, 
Celtic - How The League Was Won 49 Times, DB Publishing 2018, 
Raith Rovers On This Day, Kennedy & Boyd 2018,  
Strathmore Cricket Union The First 90 Years - A History 1928-2018 (with Richard Miller and Gavin McKiddie) 2018
Kirkcaldy On This Day, Kennedy & Boyd 2019,   
East Fife On This Day, Kennedy & Boyd 2019, 
'Sivvy', R.W. Sievwright - Scotland's Greatest Cricketer? 2019
Sixty Great Scottish Cricket Games, Kennedy & Boyd 2020, 
Dunfermline Athletic On This Day (with Gordon McKenzie), Kennedy & Boyd 2021, 
Alec McNair - Celtic's Icicle, The Celtic Star 2021, 
Forfar On This Day, Kennedy & Boyd 2021, 
The Scottish League Cup - 75 Years - 1946-2021, Pitch Publishing 2022,  
The Great Forfar Lock-Out of 1889, 2022
The Benign Aristocrats - British Prime Ministers 1951-1964, Austin Macauley 2022, 
The Celtic Rising - 1965: The Year Jock Stein Changed Everything, David Faulds 2022, 
Arbroath On This Day, Kennedy & Boyd 2022,

References

1948 births
Alumni of the University of St Andrews
Living people
Cricket historians and writers
Scottish sportswriters